Lahanan (Lanun) is a Kajang language of Sarawak, Malaysia.

External links

Languages of Malaysia
Melanau–Kajang languages
Endangered Austronesian languages